"Brasil" is a pop-rock song written and performed by Cazuza, recorded as the sixth track in his third solo album Ideologia (1988). The most well-known version of this song was recorded as a samba by Gal Costa on the soundtrack album of the telenovela Vale Tudo (1988).

Song information
The lyrics of "Brasil" were composed by Cazuza and Nilo Romero, and the music by George Israel (saxophone player of Kid Abelha). The song expresses an anti-nationalist feeling and a pessimist view on the Brazilian lifestyle and "way to handle things" (the famous "jeitinho brasileiro"). Although the song was featured on the soundtrack of Vale Tudo, a Rede Globo telenovela, it criticized the popular fascination with the network's newsmagazine TV program Fantástico.

Versions
Cazuza in the album Ideologia (1988)
Gal Costa in Vale Tudo soundtrack (1988)
Deborah Blando in the album A Different Story (1991) (recorded in a medley with "Aquarela do Brasil")
Kid Abelha in a live album Acústico MTV (2002)
Cássia Eller, available in the compilation album Perfil (2003)

Awards
"Brasil" received two Sharp Awards in 1988. Gal Costa won a special award for Best Song of the Year, while Cazuza won in the category for Best Pop/Rock Song of the Year.

See also
"Aquarela do Brasil", a patriotic song written in 1939 by Ary Barroso.

References

External links
"Brasil" lyrics at Terra.

1986 songs
Brazilian songs
Songs about Brazil
Portuguese-language songs